Jake Stanley Cole (born 11 September 1985) is an English professional footballer who plays as a goalkeeper for Gloucester City. He previously played for Queens Park Rangers, Hayes, AFC Wimbledon, Farnborough Town, Oxford United, Barnet, Plymouth Argyle, Woking and Aldershot Town.

Career
Cole was born in Hammersmith, London. He was the second choice goalkeeper at Queens Park Rangers for a number of years, being understudy to Nick Culkin, Chris Day, Paul Jones, Simon Royce and Lee Camp, but was praised by John Gregory as being a model professional. He played for Hayes, AFC Wimbledon, Farnborough Town, Oxford United and Barnet on loan during his six years there. Towards the end of the 2006–07 season he became first choice goalkeeper after Lee Camp was recalled from his loan spell to Derby County.

Cole had been given the number 12 jersey for the 2007–08 season, indicating that John Gregory would be signing a number one keeper before the start of the season, with rumours focusing on the permanent signing of Lee Camp. Camp was then signed therefore limiting Cole's first team opportunities; however Cole continued to impress for Rangers' second string with manager John Gregory saying in 2007, "I have been impressed by Jake's overall attitude and ability. He is a fantastic understudy to Lee Camp."

Cole slipped further down the pecking order at QPR following the signing of Radek Černý in the summer of 2008. He was loaned to the Conference National club Oxford United for three months on 11 July 2008. In March 2009 he joined Barnet on loan.

He was released by QPR on 19 May 2009. However, he was soon snapped up by Barnet on a one-year contract on 6 July 2009. He left Barnet at the end of the 2010–11 season. He spent time on trial with Gillingham and Plymouth Argyle in July 2011. Cole agreed a two-year contract with Argyle later that month.

At Argyle, Cole emerged as the first-choice goalkeeper ahead of club stalwart Romain Larrieu in the 2011–12 season, playing in 39 of the Pilgrims' 50 games that season, as the club scraped EFL League Two survival. Ahead of the 2012–13 season, Larrieu retired and Rene Gilmartin came in as new competition for Cole, but again he came out as first-choice, with the club nearly mirroring their performance from the previous season. The 2013–14 season was a more successful one on the pitch for Argyle, and during it Argyle re-signed Luke McCormick and so Cole found himself as the club's back-up goalkeeper, only for injuries to McCormick to see him play exactly the same number of times as McCormick that year. Cole played his last game for Argyle in a 3–3 draw with Portsmouth.

After leaving Plymouth Argyle, Cole went on to sign for Conference Premier club Woking for the 2014–15 season. In Cole's two seasons at Woking they finished 7th and then 12th in the National League before he left the Cardinals.

On 8 June 2016, Cole joined local rivals Aldershot Town, initially on a one-year contract. In Cole's first two seasons at the Shots, the club finished 5th in the National League both times, qualifying for the play-offs. In 16-17, Aldershot lost in the semi finals 5–2 on aggregate to Tranmere Rovers, with Cole making a costly error to gift James Norwood a goal in the first-leg. In 17-18, Aldershot lost in a play-off qualifying game to Ebbsfleet United on penalties, with Cole an unused sub in that game. Cole left the Shots at the end of the 2018-19 campaign and then joined Maidstone United.

Career statistics

Honours
Individual
Aldershot Town Player of the Year: 2016–17

References

External links
Jake Cole profile at the Aldershot Town F.C. website
 (Farnborough Town, Plymouth Argyle, onwards)
 (Queens Park Rangers, Oxford United, Barnet)

1985 births
Living people
Footballers from Hammersmith
English footballers
Association football goalkeepers
Queens Park Rangers F.C. players
Hayes F.C. players
AFC Wimbledon players
Farnborough F.C. players
Oxford United F.C. players
Barnet F.C. players
Plymouth Argyle F.C. players
Woking F.C. players
Aldershot Town F.C. players
Maidstone United F.C. players
Gloucester City A.F.C. players
Isthmian League players
National League (English football) players
English Football League players